Barbet is a surname. Notable people with this surname include:

 Henri Barbet (1789–1875), French industrialist and politician
 Matt Barbet (b. 1976), English newsreader
 Pierre Barbet (physician) (1884–1961), French physician
 Pierre Barbet (writer) or Claude Avice (1925–1995), French science fiction writer and pharmacist

French-language surnames